is a Japanese footballer currently playing as a forward for Machida Zelvia, on loan from Sagan Tosu.

Career statistics

Club
.

Notes

References

1999 births
Living people
Association football people from Fukuoka Prefecture
Komazawa University alumni
Japanese footballers
Association football forwards
Sagan Tosu players